Du Guesclin is a French film from 1948, directed and written by Bernard de Latour, starring Fernand Gravey. The film features Louis de Funès as an astrologer.

The film is a biopic about Bertrand du Guesclin, a baron, Constable of France, and high-ranked officer in the French Army of the 14th Century, who fights in the Hundred Years' War.

Cast 
 Fernand Gravey: Bertrand du Guesclin
 Junie Astor: Tiphaine Raguenel
 Ketti Gallian: Jeanne de Mallemains
 Noël Roquevert: Jagu, Bertrand's friend
 Gérard Oury: Charles V of France
 Gisèle Casadesus: Jeanne, the Countess of Penthièvre (Joan, Duchess of Brittany)
 Louis de Funès: astrologer
 Marcel Delaître: Chandos
 Léon Bary: Léon Barry
 Gisèle Casadesus: Sylvie

References

External links 
 

1948 films
1940s historical films
French historical films
1940s French-language films
French black-and-white films
Films set in the 14th century
Hundred Years' War films
1940s French films